Rumaitha Al Busaidi is an Omani climate change activist, women's rights activist, radio presenter, marine scientist, entrepreneur and footballer. She is regarded as the first female football analyst in the Arab World and also became the youngest Omani woman to cross South Pole. She is also widely popularly regarded as one of the prominent radio personalities in Oman.

Career 
Rumaitha obtained diploma from the University of Delaware in 2005. She obtained master's degree from the Sultan Qaboos University in 2014. She also received higher education at the Urecht University. She received Master of Public Administration degree from the Harvard Kennedy School. Rumaitha holds MSc degrees in the fields of Environmental Science and Aquaculture. She was also named as Millennium Fellow for 2019 by the Atlantic Council.

She served as vice chairperson of food manufacturing for Omani National Program for Enhancing Economic Diversification. She had also served as an adviser to the Government of Oman. She also serves as director of Projects and Environmental Affairs and Fisheries Development in Oman.

Rumaitha founded WomeX, a platform to teach negotiation skills for Arab women in order to groom emerging female entrepreneurs in the Arab region. She also advocates for women's rights as well as environmental youth leadership. She has also worked as radio presenter for several years in Oman and she is known as Oman's first local English presenter in Oman private radio station. She also played football representing Oman national women's team for a brief period of time before the team was sanctioned by FIFA in 2007.

She was part of World Economic Forum's Global Shapers Community from 2013 to 2020. In 2017, she was named as One Young World Peace Ambassador by the European Commission. In addition, she was appointed as Challenge 22 ambassador for 2022 FIFA World Cup. She was also named as ambassador for the Institute for Economics and Peace (IEP).

She has also raised her voice and concerns about the global climate change in the Davos Agenda of the World Economic Forum. She was one of the activists who took part in digital TED Countdown in April 2021 as part of Earth Day Live event.

References 

Omani activists
Omani businesspeople
Omani scientists
21st-century Omani women politicians
21st-century Omani politicians
University of Delaware alumni
Sultan Qaboos University alumni
Utrecht University alumni
Atlantic Council
Harvard Kennedy School alumni
Place of birth missing (living people)

Year of birth missing (living people)
Living people